Walter Junghans (born 26 October 1958) is a German former professional footballer who played goalkeeper.

Career
Born in Hamburg, Junghans started his professional career with Bayern Munich in 1977, where he was the back up for Sepp Maier. In 1979, Maier had to end his career after a car accident. Junghans immediately enjoyed success and Bayern won the Bundesliga title in 1980 and 1981 with him between the posts. Bayern also won the DFB-Pokal and were European Cup runners-up in 1982, although Junghans did not play in the final. Junghans was part of the European Championship-winning 1980 Germany team, but as third choice goalkeeper he did not play in any of the games. In fact he would never get capped for Germany. Junghans left Bayern for Schalke after being demoted to second choice, spending four seasons in Gelsenkirchen. His next career stop was Berlin where he joined Hertha BSC, before eventually ending his playing career in 1996 for two seasons in the 2. Bundesliga with Fortuna Köln.

Coaching career
In 2007, Junghans returned to Bayern Munich, where he again understudied Sepp Maier, this time as goalkeeper coach, before taking over upon Maier's retirement in 2008.

Honours
Bayern Munich
Bundesliga: 1979–80, 1980–81
DFB-Pokal: 1981–82
European Cup: runner-up 1981–82

Hertha BSC
2. Bundesliga: 1989–90; runner-up 1983–84

Germany
European Championship: 1980

References

External links
 

1958 births
Living people
German footballers
Footballers from Hamburg
Association football goalkeepers
Germany B international footballers
Germany youth international footballers
Olympic footballers of West Germany
West German footballers
Footballers at the 1984 Summer Olympics
UEFA Euro 1980 players
UEFA European Championship-winning players
Bundesliga players
2. Bundesliga players
SC Victoria Hamburg players
FC Bayern Munich footballers
FC Schalke 04 players
Hertha BSC players
SC Fortuna Köln players
Bayer 04 Leverkusen players
FC Bayern Munich non-playing staff
Association football goalkeeping coaches
Athletic Bilbao non-playing staff
1. FC Köln non-playing staff
S.L. Benfica non-playing staff
German expatriate sportspeople in Spain
German expatriate sportspeople in Portugal
Borussia Mönchengladbach non-playing staff